The 2005–06 season is FC Vaslui's 4th season of its existence, and its first, in Divizia A. FC Vaslui has promoted last season, after finished 1st in Liga II. In the summer, a lot of experienced players were signed, but after 15 matches, FC Vaslui was in the 16th place, having no victory, with only 6 points (all draws). In the winter, FC Vaslui bought Huţan, Sfârlea, Bukvić and Mihalcea. The team impressed in the second half of the season, finishing on 7th place. FC Vaslui assured its presence in the next season in Liga I, on 29th matchday. In the last game of the season, Steaua came to Vaslui, who needed a victory to assure its 23rd title. Unsurprisingly, Steaua won the match, but the win was very contested by Rapid Bucuresti's officials, but also by the team owner, Adrian Porumboiu. On the very next day, he announced his retirement from FC Vaslui, and the team also remained with only 8 players for the new season.

Squad

First-team squad

Statistics

Appearances and goals
Last updated on 7 June 2006.

|-
|colspan="12"|Players sold or loaned out during the season
|-

|}

Top scorers

Disciplinary record

Overall

{|class="wikitable"
|-
|Games played || 32 (30 Divizia A, 2 Cupa României)
|-
|Games won || 7 (6 Divizia A, 1 Cupa României)
|-
|Games drawn ||  11 (11 Divizia A)
|-
|Games lost || 14 (13 Divizia A, 1 Cupa României)
|-
|Goals scored || 26
|-
|Goals conceded || 40
|-
|Goal difference || -14
|-
|Yellow cards || 43
|-
|Red cards || 4
|-
|Worst discipline ||  Petar Jovanović and  Bogdan Buhuş with 6 yellow cards
|-
|Best result || 3–0 (H) v FC Argeş – Divizia A – 12 Apr 2006
|-
|Worst result || 0–4 (H) v Steaua București – Divizia A – 7 Jun 2006
|-
|Most appearances ||  Ionuţ Badea with 30 appearances
|-
|Top scorer ||  Valentin Badea (5 goals)
|-
|Points || 29/90 (32.22%)
|-

Performances
Updated to games played on 7 June 2006.

Goal minutes
Updated to games played on 7 June 2006.

Divizia A

League table

Results summary

Results by round

Matches

Cupa României

FC Vaslui seasons
Vaslui